This is a list of British television related events from 1965.

Events

January
January – The BBC collaborates with Ireland's RTÉ on a television broadcast as Irish Taoiseach Seán Lemass and Prime Minister of Northern Ireland Terence O'Neill meet for the first time in Belfast.
2 January – World of Sport premieres on ITV with Eamonn Andrews as its first presenter.
9 January – Sketch comedy show Not Only... But Also, featuring Peter Cook and Dudley Moore, debuts on BBC2.
12 January – Doctor Who begins premiering in Australia on the ABC by first being shown in Perth. It will later start airing for the first time in several states; including Sydney, Adelaide, Brisbane and Melbourne during January and the next two months.

February
No events.

March
26 March – Border Television begins broadcasting to the Isle of Man.

April
7 April – BBC1 airs Three Clear Sundays, a Wednesday Play about the events leading to a man's conviction for capital murder. It is repeated on BBC2 on 16 July.

May
30 May – A televised tribute to the late British bandleader and impresario Jack Hylton called The Stars Shine for Jack is held in London at the Theatre Royal, Drury Lane.

June
18 June – The last edition of Tonight is broadcast on BBC1.
27 June – The last episode of science-fiction marionette series Stingray is broadcast on ITV.

July
5 July  – Anglia Television starts broadcasting on VHF channel 6 from Sandy Heath transmitting station, extending coverage into Bedfordshire, Cambridgeshire and Northamptonshire. Until late 1966, there are no morning broadcasts from this transmitter due to a clash with the Mullard Radio Astronomy Observatory.
7 July – The long-running science and technology programme Tomorrow's World makes its debut on BBC1.
22 July – The pilot episode for the sitcom Till Death Us Do Part is broadcast on BBC1.

August
1 August – Cigarette adverts are banned from British television. Pipe tobacco and cigar adverts will continue until 1991.
6 August – The War Game, a drama-documentary by director Peter Watkins depicting the events of a fictional nuclear attack on the United Kingdom, is controversially pulled from its planned transmission in BBC1's The Wednesday Play anthology strand. The BBC has been pressured into this move by the British government, which does not want much of the play's content to become public. It is released to cinemas, and wins the 1966 Academy Award for Documentary Feature; the BBC finally screens the play in 1985.

September
12 September – BBC2 Wales goes on the air. To introduce the service, BBC2 airs a programme titled BBC-2 Comes to Wales, featuring the Secretary of State for Wales James Griffiths, the Lord Mayor of Cardiff, the Deputy Mayor of Newport, Chairman of the Broadcasting Council for Wales Professor Glanmor Williams, BBC2 Controller David Attenborough, and BBC2 Wales Controller Alun Oldfield-Davies.
30 September – Gerry and Sylvia Anderson's well known science-fiction marionette series (with electronic lip syncing known as Supermarionation) Thunderbirds premieres on ITV.

October
2 October – American science-fiction series Lost in Space debuts on ITV, it is later adapted for the feature film version in 1998 and then again for the revived television series in 2018, after the original series ends in 1968.
4 October 
United! premieres on BBC1.
Science-fiction anthology series Out of the Unknown premieres on BBC2.
24 Hours premieres on BBC1.
The BBC announces plans to introduce a new service for Asian immigrants starting the following week.
10 October – The BBC Asian service, broadcast on Sunday mornings, launches with a programme called In Logon Se Miliye and at the start of 1966 it is renamed Apma Hi Ghar Samajhiye. Later in the decade it is called Nai Zindagi-Naya Jeevan and in June 1982 it is renamed and relaunched as Asian Magazine. 
18 October – The British version of children's programme The Magic Roundabout debuts on BBC1, it continues until 1977.
31 October – BBC2 in the North of England goes on the air.

November
4 November – The current affairs and documentary series Man Alive makes its debut on BBC2.
8 November – American sitcom My Mother the Car debuts on ITV; it becomes known for negative reception.
13 November – The word "fuck" is spoken for the first time on British television by the theatre critic Kenneth Tynan.

December
13 December – The long-running children's storytelling series Jackanory makes its debut on BBC1. It runs until 1996 and is briefly revived in 2006.
20 December – Anglia starts broadcasting on VHF channel 20 from Belmont transmitting station, extending coverage into Lincolnshire, East Riding of Yorkshire and northern parts of Norfolk.

Debuts

BBC1
6 January – Jonny Quest (1964–1965)
9 January – Not Only... But Also (1965–1970)
28 January – Alexander Graham Bell (1965)
2 March – The Walrus and the Carpenter (1965)
22 March – A Man Called Harry Brent (1965)
24 March – The Airbase (1965)
27 March – The Flying Swan (1965)
31 March – Going for a Song (1965–1977, 1995–2002)
8 April – The Wars of the Roses (1965)
11 April – A Tale of Two Cities (1965)
13 April – The Bed-Sit Girl (1965–1966)
18 April – And So to Ted (1965)
23 April – Lil (1965–1966)
30 May – The World of Wooster (1965–1967)
5 June – The Val Doonican Show (1965–1970)
20 June – Poison Island (1965)
24 June – The Man from U.N.C.L.E. (1964–1968)
6 July – The Lance Percival Show (1965–1966)
7 July – The Troubleshooters (1965–1972)
7 July – Tomorrow's World (1965–2003)
15 July – The Illustrated Weekly Hudd (1965–1967)
22 July – Till Death Us Do Part (1965–1975)
29 July – Pogles Wood (1965–1968)
1 August – Heiress of Garth (1965)
3 August – 199 Park Lane (1965)
4 August – The Wednesday Thriller (1965)
26 August – Moulded in Earth (1965)
12 September – Hereward the Wake (1965)
2 October – BBC-3 (1965–1966)
4 October – United! (1965–1967)
4 October – 24 Hours (1965–1972)
6 October – Hector Heathcote (1959–1963)
8 October – The Mask of Janus (1965)
9 October – The Munsters (1964–1966)
12 October – The Adventures of Robinson Crusoe (1965–1966)
16 October – Get Smart (1965–1970)
18 October – The Magic Roundabout (1965–1977)
19 October – The Newcomers (1965–1969)
19 October – Play of the Month (1965–1983)
23 November – Hudd (1965)
13 December – Jackanory (1965–1996, 2006)
17 December – Barney Is My Darling (1965–1966)

BBC2
18 January – Hit and Run (1965)
27 January – Night Train to Surbiton (1965)
11 February – Naked Island (1965)
21 February – The Mill on the Floss (1965)
22 March – A Man Called Harry Brent (1965)
5 May – Call It What You Like (1965)
9 May – The Scarlet and the Black (1965)
13 May – Londoners (1965) 
13 June – The Rise and Fall of César Birotteau (1965)
9 July – Legend of Death (1965)
11 July – Jury Room (1965)
31 July – Gaslight Theatre (1965)
8 September – A Slight Case of... (1965)
2 October – For Whom the Bell Tolls (1965)
4 October – Out of the Unknown (1965–1971)
7 October – Thirty-Minute Theatre (1965–1973)
17 October – Call My Bluff (1965–1988, 1994, 1996–2005)
17 October – An Enemy of the State (1965)
4 November – Man Alive (1965–1981)
5 December – The Big Spender (1965–1966)

ITV
2 January – World of Sport (1965–1985)
19 January – Front Page Story (1965)
23 January – Public Eye (1965–1975)
23 February – Mr and Mrs (1965–1988; 1995–1999) 
27 February – The Worker (1965–1970; 1978)
13 April – Orlando (1965–1968)
30 April – Six Shades of Black (1965)
8 May – Undermind (1965)
2 June – Pardon the Expression (1965–1966)
11 June – The Man in Room 17 (1965–1966)
16 June – Deckie Learner (1965)
2 August – Riviera Police (1965)
11 August – Six of the Best (1965)
21 August – Broad and Narrow (1965)
21 August – The Frankie Vaughan Show (1965–1966)
10 September – Blackmail (1965–1966)
30 September – Thunderbirds (1965–1966)
1 October – The Addams Family (1964–1966)
2 October 
Lost in Space (1965–1968, 2018–2021)
Knock on Any Door (1965–1966)
19 October –Object Z (1965)
8 November – My Mother the Car (1965–1966)
13 December – The Power Game (1965–1969)
16 December – Court Martial (1965–1966)
25 December – The Bruce Forsyth Show (1965–1969)
Unknown 
Flipper (1964–1967)
Peyton Place  (1964–1969)

Television shows

Changes of network affiliation

Continuing television shows

1920s
BBC Wimbledon (1927–1939, 1946–2019, 2021–2024)

1930s
The Boat Race (1938–1939, 1946–2019)
BBC Cricket (1939, 1946–1999, 2020–2024)

1940s
Come Dancing (1949–1998)

1950s
Andy Pandy (1950–1970, 2002–2005)
Watch with Mother (1952–1975) 
The Good Old Days (1953–1983)
Panorama (1953–present)
Sunday Night at the London Palladium (1955–1967, 1973–1974)
Take Your Pick! (1955–1968, 1992–1998)
Double Your Money (1955–1968)
Dixon of Dock Green (1955–1976)
Crackerjack (1955–1984, 2020–present)
Opportunity Knocks (1956–1978, 1987–1990)
This Week (1956–1978, 1986–1992)
Armchair Theatre (1956–1974)
What the Papers Say (1956–2008)
The Sky at Night (1957–present)
Blue Peter (1958–present)
Grandstand (1958–2007)

1960s
The Flintstones (1960–1966)
Coronation Street (1960–present)
The Avengers (1961–1969)
Songs of Praise (1961–present)
Hugh and I (1962–1967)
The Saint (1962–1969)
Z-Cars (1962–1978)
Animal Magic (1962–1983)
Ready Steady Go! (1963–1966)
Doctor Who (1963–1989, 1996, 2005–present)
World in Action (1963–1998)
The Likely Lads (1964–1966)
Redcap (1964–1966)
The Wednesday Play (1964–1970)
Top of the Pops (1964–2006)
Match of the Day (1964–present)
Crossroads (1964–1988, 2001–2003)
Play School (1964–1988)

Ending this year
 Rag, Tag and Bobtail (1953–1965)
 Picture Book (1955–1965)
 Monitor (1958–1965)
 Noggin the Nog (1959–1965, 1966–1982)
 Sykes and a... (1960–1965)
 Compact (1962–1965)
 Steptoe and Son (1962–1965, 1970–1974)
 The Beat Room (1964–1965)
 Not So Much a Programme, More a Way of Life (1964–1965)
 The Sullavan Brothers (1964–1965)

Births
4 January – Julia Ormond, British actress
9 January – Joely Richardson, British actress
14 January – Hugh Fearnley-Whittingstall, English chef
15 January – James Nesbitt, Northern Irish actor
27 January – Alan Cumming, Scottish actor
22 February – John Leslie, television presenter
26 February – Alison Armitage, English model and actress
11 March – Lawrence Llewelyn-Bowen, British television presenter
22 March – Emma Wray, actress
30 March – Piers Morgan, British tabloid journalist
4 April – Sean Wilson, British actor
21 April – Jacquie Beltrao, sports presenter
27 April – Anna Chancellor, British actress
29 April – Rosie Rowell, actress
3 May – Michael Marshall Smith, novelist, screenwriter and short story writer
17 May 
Jeremy Vine, British BBC radio and television presenter
Alice Beer, television presenter
19 June – Simon O'Brien, television actor and radio presenter
4 July – Jo Whiley, British Radio DJ
8 July – Matthew Wright, journalist and television presenter
6 August – Mark Speight, British television presenter (died 2008)
16 September – Lorne Spicer, presenter (Cash in the Attic) 
24 September – Sheryl Gascoigne, television personality
14 October – Steve Coogan, British comedian and actor
15 October – Stephen Tompkinson, British actor
31 October – Rob Rackstraw, British voice actor
4 November – Shaun Williamson, British actor
10 November – Sean Hughes, English-born Irish comedian (died 2017)
12 November – Eddie Mair, British BBC radio and television presenter
16 November – Mark Benton, actor
21 November – Alexander Siddig, Sudanese-born actor

Deaths
23 February – Stan Laurel, English-born comedian, surviving half of Laurel and Hardy, aged 74 
22 December – Richard Dimbleby, journalist and broadcaster, aged 52, testicular cancer

See also
 1965 in British music
 1965 in British radio
 1965 in the United Kingdom
 List of British films of 1965

References